Kastigarh (also spelt as Kashtigarh) is a village and tehsil in Doda district of the Jammu division of Jammu and Kashmir, India. In 2022, Kastigarh became the part of Doda West Assembly constituency.

References

Villages in Doda district